Gilmour is an unincorporated community in Greene and Sullivan counties, in the U.S. state of Indiana.

History
Gilmour was founded in 1900, and was named for the Gilmour family, who were among those who first built there.

Geography

References

Unincorporated communities in Greene County, Indiana
Unincorporated communities in Sullivan County, Indiana
Unincorporated communities in Indiana
Bloomington metropolitan area, Indiana
1900 establishments in Indiana